William Whitmarsh Phelps (1 October 1797 – 22 June 1863) was Archdeacon of Carlisle from 1863 until 1867.

Phelps was educated at Corpus Christi College, Oxford, where he matriculated in 1815 and graduated B.A. in 1819. He graduated M.A. in 1822, and was a Fellow of the college from 1822 to 1824. He was then an Assistant Master at Harrow School and  Perpetual curate at Holy Trinity, Reading until his appointment as Archdeacon.

He died on 22 June 1863.

Notes
 

 

1797 births
1867 deaths
People from Wilton, Wiltshire
Alumni of Corpus Christi College, Oxford
Archdeacons of Carlisle